Tuanjiehu station is a subway station on Line 10 of the Beijing Subway. The station handled a peak entry and exit traffic of 80,700 people on May 5, 2013.

The station has 4 exits. Exit A is located on the Northwest side of the station, not far from the Taikoo Li Sanlitun Shopping Center. Exit B, C and D are respectively to the Northeast, Southeast and Southwest of the station.

Station layout 
The station has an underground island platform.

Exits 
There are 4 exits, lettered A, B, C, and D. Exit C is accessible.

Gallery

References

External links

Beijing Subway stations in Chaoyang District
Railway stations in China opened in 2008